was a Japanese economist known for his contributions to mathematical economics. In particular, he is recognized as one of the first economists to utilize Lyapunov stability theory for analyzing the stability of economic equilibria.

In 1970, he served as president of the Japanese Economic Association.

References 

1909 births
1995 deaths
Japanese economists
Member of the Mont Pelerin Society